The 1947 BYU Cougars football team was an American football team that represented Brigham Young University (BYU) as a member of the Mountain States Conference (MSC) during the Mountain States Conference (MSC) during the 1947 college football season. In their seventh season under head coach Eddie Kimball, the Cougars compiled an overall record of 3–7 with a mark of 1–5 against conference opponents, finished seventh in the MSC, and were outscored by a total of 182 to 168.

Schedule

References

BYU
BYU Cougars football seasons
BYU Cougars football